Dhindora is a 2021 Indian comedy drama web series created by Bhuvan Bam and directed by Himank Gaur.  Bam plays multiple characters, and the series also stars Gayatri Bhardwaj and Jeeveshu Ahluwalia. Bam claimed that by July 2022, the show had had more than 500 million views.

Cast 

 Bhuvan Bam as Bhuvan, Babloo (Bhuwan's Father), Bancho Chhatriwala (Bhuwan's Friend), Jaanki (Bhuwan's Mother), Sameer Fuddi (Bhuwan's Friend), Titu (Jaanki's Brother), Detective Mangloo, Mr. Hola (Babloo's Friend), Bubbly Sir (Teacher), Lakhan Chhatriwala (Papa MKC)
 Gayatri Bhardwaj as Dr. Tara
 Jeeveshu Ahluwalia as Chef 
 Rajesh Tailang as Paarshad
 Arun Kushwah as Telemarketing Baba 
 Badri Chavan as Ricksaw guy 
 Anup Soni as Self
 Bikran Nakati as Bikram
 Ishtiyak Khan as Boss 
 Ankur Pathak as Lottery boy
 Tejas Kolekar as Budh
 Devraj Patel as Student
 Arsh Parmindra Shah as Resident of society
 Gurpreet Kkaur as Airhostess
 Ajay Madhok as Society man
 Laxman Dawbhat as Shop Owner
 Manish

Episodes 

The first season has eight episodes, which were released on Bam's YouTube channel from 14 October until 2 December 2021.  In August 2022, Bam released a statement saying that there would be a second season of the series.

Songs

References

External links 

 

Hindi-language web series
Indian drama web series
Indian comedy web series